The Rural Municipality of Milden No. 286 is a rural municipality (RM) in the Canadian province of Saskatchewan within Census Division No. 12 and  Division No. 5.

History 
The RM of Milden No. 286 incorporated as a rural municipality on December 12, 1910.

Geography 
There are two lakes within the RM – Barber Lake and Milden Lake. Barber Lake and its outflow, Macdonald Creek, are within the Barber Lake (SK 050) Important Bird Area (IBA) of Canada.

Communities and localities 
The following urban municipalities are surrounded by the RM.

Villages
 Dinsmore
 Milden
 Wiseton

Demographics 

Attractions 
 Milden Lake
 Milden Community Museum
 Yester Years Community Museum

Government 
The RM of Milden No. 286 is governed by an elected municipal council and an appointed administrator that meets on the second Wednesday of every month. The reeve of the RM is Grant Thomson while its administrator is Denise Ward. The RM's office is located in Milden.

Transportation 
 Saskatchewan Highway 15
 Saskatchewan Highway 42
 Saskatchewan Highway 44
 Saskatchewan Highway 655

See also 
List of rural municipalities in Saskatchewan

References 

M

Important Bird Areas of Saskatchewan